Matthew Hazley (born 30 December 1987) is a Northern Irish footballer who plays for FC Mindwell in the Mid-Ulster Football League.

Career
Hazley moved to Stoke City in 2004 from Glenavon. He joined Stafford Rangers in August 2007, for an initial one-month loan spell, and made his debut in the 3–1 defeat against Kidderminster Harriers.

He made his debut for Northern Ireland Under-21 team on 14 November 2006 in a 2–1 defeat against Germany. Hazley made his one and only Stoke appearance in a match against Coventry City on 24 May 2006, he came on as a substitute in the 56th minute. Hazley was offered a four-month extension to his contract in May 2007, to prove his fitness following injury.

On 15 August 2007 Hazley was sent on a one-month loan to Stafford Rangers, where he made six appearances. He returned to Stoke on 12 September 2007 after he was sent off during Stafford's 3–0 defeat to Stevenage the previous day. In early January 2008, following his release from Stoke City, Hazley signed for Stafford Rangers, but signed for Scottish First Division side Airdrie United in July 2008 after a successful trial with the club.

Hazley returned to Northern Ireland to play for Newry City in 2010 and then signed for Crusaders in 2011, before making the move to Dungannon Swifts in May 2012.

Hazley then made the switch from Dungannon to Portadown in 2017 before announcing he would be leaving the club in late 2017. Hazley then joined Mid-Ulster side Banbridge Rangers in 2018.

Career statistics
Sourced from

References

External links

1987 births
Airdrieonians F.C. players
Association footballers from Northern Ireland
Association football defenders
Glenavon F.C. players
Living people
Northern Ireland under-21 international footballers
People from Banbridge
Scottish Football League players
Stafford Rangers F.C. players
Stoke City F.C. players
Crusaders F.C. players
English Football League players
NIFL Premiership players
Newry City F.C. players
Dungannon Swifts F.C. players
Portadown F.C. players